The St. Louis Cardinals' 1985 season was the team's 104th season in St. Louis, Missouri and the 94th season in the National League.  The Cardinals went 101-61 during the season (their best record in the Herzog era) and finished in first place in the National League East division by three games over the New York Mets. After defeating the Los Angeles Dodgers in six games in the NLCS, they lost in seven games in the World Series to their cross-state rivals, the Kansas City Royals in the I-70 Series. The World Series is known for the infamous "safe" call on the Royals' Jorge Orta by umpire Don Denkinger.

The Cardinals switched back to their traditional gray road uniforms for the first time in ten seasons.

Outfielder Willie McGee won the National League MVP Award this year, batting .353 with 10 home runs and 82 RBIs. Outfielder Vince Coleman won the National League Rookie of the Year Award this year, batting .267 with 107 runs scored and 110 stolen bases. Shortstop Ozzie Smith and McGee both won Gold Gloves this year.

During the 1985 playoffs, the Cardinals used the slogan The Heat Is On, in reference to the song that was released earlier that year.

Offseason
November 9, 1984: Dave Von Ohlen was released by the Cardinals.
December 12, 1984: George Hendrick and Steve Barnard (minors) were traded by the Cardinals to the Pittsburgh Pirates for Brian Harper and John Tudor.
January 3, 1985: Alex Cole was drafted by the Cardinals in the 2nd round of the 1985 amateur draft. Player signed May 6, 1985.
January 23, 1985: Mike LaValliere was signed as a free agent by the Cardinals.
February 1, 1985: Dave LaPoint, David Green, José Uribe and Gary Rajsich were traded by the Cardinals to the San Francisco Giants for Jack Clark

Regular season

Opening Day starters
 Steve Braun
 Jack Clark
 Bob Forsch
 Tom Herr
 Mike LaValliere
 Willie McGee
 Terry Pendleton
 Ozzie Smith
 Andy Van Slyke

Season standings

Record vs. opponents

Notable transactions
April 21, 1985: Matt Keough was signed as a free agent by the Cardinals.
June 3, 1985: Steve Peters was drafted by the Cardinals in the 5th round of the 1985 Major League Baseball draft.
July 22, 1985: Gary Rajsich was purchased by the Cardinals from the San Francisco Giants.
August 29, 1985: Mark Jackson (minors) was traded by the Cardinals to the Cincinnati Reds for César Cedeño.

Roster

Player stats

Batting

Starters by position
Note: Pos = position; G = Games played; AB = At bats; H = Hits; Avg. = Batting average; HR = Home runs; RBI = Runs batted in

Other batters
Note: G = Games played; AB = At bats; H = Hits; Avg. = Batting average; HR = Home runs; RBI = Runs batted in

Pitching

Starting pitchers
Note: G = Games pitched; IP = Innings pitched; W = Wins; L = Losses; ERA = Earned run average; SO = Strikeouts

Other pitchers
Note: G = Games pitched; IP = Innings pitched; W = Wins; L = Losses; SV = Saves; ERA = Earned run average; SO = Strikeouts

Relief pitchers
Note: G = Games pitched; IP = Innings pitched; W = Wins; L = Losses; SV = Saves; ERA = Earned run average; SO = Strikeouts

NLCS

The NLCS against the Dodgers featured two game-winning home runs by shortstop Ozzie Smith in Game 5 and first baseman Jack Clark in Game 6, both off Dodgers reliever Tom Niedenfuer.  In a rare display of power-hitting, Smith hit his in walk-off fashion in the bottom of the ninth inning, prompting the famous call of "Go crazy, folks!  Go crazy!" by Jack Buck.  This play is considered one of the key highlights in all of Cardinals' history.

Game 1
Wednesday, October 9 at Dodger Stadium (Los Angeles)

Game 2
Thursday, October 10 at Dodger Stadium (Los Angeles)

Game 3
Saturday, October 12 at Busch Stadium (St. Louis)

Game 4
Sunday, October 13 at Busch Stadium (St. Louis)

Game 5
Monday, October 14 at Busch Stadium (St. Louis)

Game 6
Wednesday, October 16 at Dodger Stadium (Los Angeles)

World Series

The 1985 World Series was christened the "I-70 Series" and the "Show-Me Series" because it featured the in-state rival Kansas City Royals, the first time the two teams met in a non-exhibition setting.  It also featured some of the most controversial series of events in Cardinals history.  Coleman was unable to play in this Series due to an injury sustained in the NLCS after being rolled up in the mechanical tarpaulin at Busch Stadium.  Scribes remarked about the "killer tarp", but it proved metaphorical.

After St. Louis gained a 3–2 series advantage, Game 6 tipped off the controversy with "The Call".  With the Cardinals leading 1-0 in the bottom of the ninth inning, umpire Don Denkinger called Royals batter Jorge Orta safe at first base — a call refuted by broadcast television's instant replay.  Several batters later, they lost Game 6 by the score of 2–1.  After "The Call", St. Louis proceeded to lose Game 7 by a score of 11-0, and thus, the Series, due to an error and passed ball.  Despite both of their pitching aces participating in this game, they failed to come through — starter John Tudor, who had won his two prior starts in the Series, punched a mechanical fan when removed from the game.  His severely cut pitching hand required stitching at a Kansas City hospital while the game was ongoing.  Joaquín Andújar, the other ace pressed into relief, was ejected by home plate umpire Denkinger for arguing balls and strikes.

AL Kansas City Royals (4) vs. NL St. Louis Cardinals (3)

Awards and honors
 Vince Coleman, National League Rookie of the Year Award
 Vince Coleman, Major League Baseball Stolen Base Leader (110)
 Whitey Herzog, Associated Press Manager of the Year
 Ozzie Smith, Shortstop, Golden Glove Award
 Willie McGee, Outfield, Golden Glove Award

Farm system

LEAGUE CHAMPIONS: Louisville

References

External links
1985 St. Louis Cardinals at Baseball Reference
1985 St. Louis Cardinals at Baseball Almanac

St. Louis Cardinals seasons
National League East champion seasons
National League champion seasons
St. Louis Cardinals